This is an incomplete list of Acts of the Parliament of the United Kingdom from its establishment in 1801 up until the present.

Lists of Acts by Year
 List of Acts of the Parliament of the United Kingdom, 1801–1819
 List of Acts of the Parliament of the United Kingdom, 1820–1839
 List of Acts of the Parliament of the United Kingdom, 1840–1859
 List of Acts of the Parliament of the United Kingdom, 1860–1879
 List of Acts of the Parliament of the United Kingdom, 1880–1899
 List of Acts of the Parliament of the United Kingdom, 1900–1919
 List of Acts of the Parliament of the United Kingdom, 1920–1939
 List of Acts of the Parliament of the United Kingdom, 1940–1959
 List of Acts of the Parliament of the United Kingdom from 1960
 List of Acts of the Parliament of the United Kingdom from 1961
 List of Acts of the Parliament of the United Kingdom from 1962
 List of Acts of the Parliament of the United Kingdom from 1963
 List of Acts of the Parliament of the United Kingdom from 1964
 List of Acts of the Parliament of the United Kingdom from 1965
 List of Acts of the Parliament of the United Kingdom from 1966
 List of Acts of the Parliament of the United Kingdom from 1967
 List of Acts of the Parliament of the United Kingdom from 1968
 List of Acts of the Parliament of the United Kingdom from 1969
 List of Acts of the Parliament of the United Kingdom from 1970
 List of Acts of the Parliament of the United Kingdom from 1971
 List of Acts of the Parliament of the United Kingdom from 1972
 List of Acts of the Parliament of the United Kingdom from 1973
 List of Acts of the Parliament of the United Kingdom from 1974
 List of Acts of the Parliament of the United Kingdom from 1975
 List of Acts of the Parliament of the United Kingdom from 1976
 List of Acts of the Parliament of the United Kingdom from 1977
 List of Acts of the Parliament of the United Kingdom from 1978
 List of Acts of the Parliament of the United Kingdom from 1979
 List of Acts of the Parliament of the United Kingdom from 1980
 List of Acts of the Parliament of the United Kingdom from 1981
 List of Acts of the Parliament of the United Kingdom from 1982
 List of Acts of the Parliament of the United Kingdom from 1983
 List of Acts of the Parliament of the United Kingdom from 1984
 List of Acts of the Parliament of the United Kingdom from 1985
 List of Acts of the Parliament of the United Kingdom from 1986
 List of Acts of the Parliament of the United Kingdom from 1987
 List of Acts of the Parliament of the United Kingdom from 1988
 List of Acts of the Parliament of the United Kingdom from 1989
 List of Acts of the Parliament of the United Kingdom from 1990
 List of Acts of the Parliament of the United Kingdom from 1991
 List of Acts of the Parliament of the United Kingdom from 1992
 List of Acts of the Parliament of the United Kingdom from 1993
 List of Acts of the Parliament of the United Kingdom from 1994
 List of Acts of the Parliament of the United Kingdom from 1995
 List of Acts of the Parliament of the United Kingdom from 1996
 List of Acts of the Parliament of the United Kingdom from 1997
 List of Acts of the Parliament of the United Kingdom from 1998
 List of Acts of the Parliament of the United Kingdom from 1999
 List of Acts of the Parliament of the United Kingdom from 2000
 List of Acts of the Parliament of the United Kingdom from 2001
 List of Acts of the Parliament of the United Kingdom from 2002
 List of Acts of the Parliament of the United Kingdom from 2003
 List of Acts of the Parliament of the United Kingdom from 2004
 List of Acts of the Parliament of the United Kingdom from 2005
 List of Acts of the Parliament of the United Kingdom from 2006
 List of Acts of the Parliament of the United Kingdom from 2007
 List of Acts of the Parliament of the United Kingdom from 2008
 List of Acts of the Parliament of the United Kingdom from 2009
 List of Acts of the Parliament of the United Kingdom from 2010
 List of Acts of the Parliament of the United Kingdom from 2011
 List of Acts of the Parliament of the United Kingdom from 2012
 List of Acts of the Parliament of the United Kingdom from 2013
 List of Acts of the Parliament of the United Kingdom from 2014
 List of Acts of the Parliament of the United Kingdom from 2015
 List of Acts of the Parliament of the United Kingdom from 2016
 List of Acts of the Parliament of the United Kingdom from 2017
 List of Acts of the Parliament of the United Kingdom from 2018
 List of Acts of the Parliament of the United Kingdom from 2019
 List of Acts of the Parliament of the United Kingdom from 2020
 List of Acts of the Parliament of the United Kingdom from 2021
 List of Acts of the Parliament of the United Kingdom from 2022
 List of Acts of the Parliament of the United Kingdom from 2023

Lists of Acts by Session of Parliament
 List of Acts of the 1st Session of the 42nd Parliament of the United Kingdom
 List of Acts of the 2nd Session of the 42nd Parliament of the United Kingdom
 List of Acts of the 3rd Session of the 42nd Parliament of the United Kingdom
 List of Acts of the 4th Session of the 42nd Parliament of the United Kingdom
 List of Acts of the 5th Session of the 42nd Parliament of the United Kingdom
 List of Acts of the 1st Session of the 43rd Parliament of the United Kingdom
 List of Acts of the 2nd Session of the 43rd Parliament of the United Kingdom
 List of Acts of the 1st Session of the 44th Parliament of the United Kingdom
 List of Acts of the 2nd Session of the 44th Parliament of the United Kingdom
 List of Acts of the 3rd Session of the 44th Parliament of the United Kingdom
 List of Acts of the 4th Session of the 44th Parliament of the United Kingdom
 List of Acts of the 1st Session of the 45th Parliament of the United Kingdom
 List of Acts of the 2nd Session of the 45th Parliament of the United Kingdom
 List of Acts of the 3rd Session of the 45th Parliament of the United Kingdom
 List of Acts of the 4th Session of the 45th Parliament of the United Kingdom
 List of Acts of the 46th Parliament of the United Kingdom
 List of Acts of the 1st Session of the 47th Parliament of the United Kingdom
 List of Acts of the 2nd Session of the 47th Parliament of the United Kingdom
 List of Acts of the 3rd Session of the 47th Parliament of the United Kingdom
 List of Acts of the 4th Session of the 47th Parliament of the United Kingdom
 List of Acts of the 5th Session of the 47th Parliament of the United Kingdom
 List of Acts of the 1st Session of the 48th Parliament of the United Kingdom
 List of Acts of the 2nd Session of the 48th Parliament of the United Kingdom
 List of Acts of the 3rd Session of the 48th Parliament of the United Kingdom
 List of Acts of the 4th Session of the 48th Parliament of the United Kingdom
 List of Acts of the 1st Session of the 49th Parliament of the United Kingdom
 List of Acts of the 2nd Session of the 49th Parliament of the United Kingdom
 List of Acts of the 3rd Session of the 49th Parliament of the United Kingdom
 List of Acts of the 4th Session of the 49th Parliament of the United Kingdom
 List of Acts of the 1st Session of the 50th Parliament of the United Kingdom
 List of Acts of the 2nd Session of the 50th Parliament of the United Kingdom
 List of Acts of the 3rd Session of the 50th Parliament of the United Kingdom
 List of Acts of the 4th Session of the 50th Parliament of the United Kingdom
 List of Acts of the 5th Session of the 50th Parliament of the United Kingdom
 List of Acts of the 1st Session of the 51st Parliament of the United Kingdom
 List of Acts of the 2nd Session of the 51st Parliament of the United Kingdom
 List of Acts of the 3rd Session of the 51st Parliament of the United Kingdom
 List of Acts of the 4th Session of the 51st Parliament of the United Kingdom
 List of Acts of the 5th Session of the 51st Parliament of the United Kingdom
 List of Acts of the 1st Session of the 52nd Parliament of the United Kingdom
 List of Acts of the 2nd Session of the 52nd Parliament of the United Kingdom
 List of Acts of the 3rd Session of the 52nd Parliament of the United Kingdom
 List of Acts of the 4th Session of the 52nd Parliament of the United Kingdom
 List of Acts of the 1st Session of the 53rd Parliament of the United Kingdom
 List of Acts of the 2nd Session of the 53rd Parliament of the United Kingdom
 List of Acts of the 3rd Session of the 53rd Parliament of the United Kingdom
 List of Acts of the 4th Session of the 53rd Parliament of the United Kingdom
 List of Acts of the 1st Session of the 54th Parliament of the United Kingdom
 List of Acts of the 2nd Session of the 54th Parliament of the United Kingdom
 List of Acts of the 3rd Session of the 54th Parliament of the United Kingdom
 List of Acts of the 4th Session of the 54th Parliament of the United Kingdom
 List of Acts of the 5th Session of the 54th Parliament of the United Kingdom
 List of Acts of the 1st Session of the 55th Parliament of the United Kingdom
 List of Acts of the 2nd Session of the 55th Parliament of the United Kingdom
 List of Acts of the 3rd Session of the 55th Parliament of the United Kingdom
 List of Acts of the 4th Session of the 55th Parliament of the United Kingdom
 List of Acts of the 1st Session of the 56th Parliament of the United Kingdom
 List of Acts of the 2nd Session of the 56th Parliament of the United Kingdom
 List of Acts of the 1st Session of the 57th Parliament of the United Kingdom
 List of Acts of the 2nd Session of the 57th Parliament of the United Kingdom
 List of Acts of the 1st Session of the 58th Parliament of the United Kingdom
 List of Acts of the 2nd Session of the 58th Parliament of the United Kingdom

See also
Note that the first parliament of the United Kingdom was held in 1801; parliaments between 1707 and 1800 were either parliaments of Great Britain or of Ireland.  For Acts passed up until 1707 see List of Acts of the Parliament of England and List of Acts of the Parliament of Scotland.  For Acts passed from 1707 to 1800 see List of Acts of the Parliament of Great Britain.  See also the List of Acts of the Parliament of Ireland.

For Acts of the devolved parliaments and assemblies in the United Kingdom, see the List of Acts of the Scottish Parliament from 1999, the List of Acts of the Northern Ireland Assembly, and the List of Acts and Measures of the National Assembly for Wales; see also the List of Acts of the Parliament of Northern Ireland.

 
Lists of Acts of the Parliament of the United Kingdom